Aromobates saltuensis (common name: salty rocket frog) is a species of frog in the family Aromobatidae. It is endemic to humid lower montane forest of the Táchira state in western Venezuela.
Its natural habitat is humid lower montane Andean forest. The male protects the eggs that are laid on land. After hatching, the male carries the tadpoles on his back to water where they develop further.

Aromobates saltuensis is threatened by habitat loss caused by agriculture, involving both crops and livestock, as well as logging, water pollution, and infrastructure development. Its distribution occurrence is subject to strong anthropogenic pressure, and none of the populations are known to occur in protected areas.

References

saltuensis
Amphibians of Venezuela
Endemic fauna of Venezuela
Taxonomy articles created by Polbot
Amphibians described in 1980